Rižana is a settlement in the Istrian City Municipality of Koper in the Littoral region of Slovenia. It includes the hamlets of Bižaji, Paluzi, Santini, and Tinčki and is located on the Rižana River.

Name
The name Rižana is originally a hydronym referring to the Rižana River, which flows past the village.

History
Rižana is usually considered to be the site of the important early medieval dispute known as the Plea of Rizana or Placitum of Riziano, which took place in 804.

References

External links

Rižana on Geopedia

Populated places in the City Municipality of Koper